The siege of Qamishli and Al-Hasakah was a siege laid upon Baathist Syrian government-controlled areas of the towns of Qamishli and Al-Hasakah by the Asayish forces of the AANES. The siege was enacted allegedly in response to the restrictions of exclusively SDF-controlled areas of the Shahba region and the restriction of movement and supplies to the YPG-controlled neighborhoods of Sheikh Maqsoud and Ashrafieh in Aleppo by the Syrian government. 

The siege was mainly centered in the Hasakah Security Box, and the neighborhoods of Halko and al-Tayy in Qamishli, preventing the entry of forces loyal to the Syrian government as well as supplies and fuel to the areas. The siege began on 10 January 2021 after the two sides failed to reach an agreement regarding a wide range of issues, including release of AANES prisoners.

Siege

On 10 January, Asayish forces began blocking the arrival of food, supplies, water tanks, students and workers to the towns. 3 high ranking Syrian Army officers were arrested in Hasakah. Demands were made to the Damascus government for the release 450 SDF prisoners, the withdrawal of SAA forces from the AANES-controlled areas, and the provision of social guarantees, medical services and education.

On 23 January clashes erupted between the two sides, resulting in the wounding of 6 pro-government forces. The NDF claimed that one of their checkpoints had been attacked, while the Asayish claimed that the NDF had attacked one of their checkpoints. Clashes resumed that night leading to injuries, with activists claiming one NDF militiaman was killed in the clashes.

On 31 January, Asayish opened fire on a pro-government vigil in Hasakah condemning the siege, killing one policeman and injuring another policeman and six civilians.

On 2 February, government forces and the Asayish reached an agreement. The siege of the government-held neighborhoods in Qamishli and Hasakah were lifted, and the two sides began to forge a deal to end the government restrictions in Aleppo city and the countryside.

See also 
AANES–Syria relations
Battle of al-Hasakah (2016)
Battle of Qamishli (2016)
 Qamishli clashes (2021)

References

2021 in the Syrian civil war
Al-Hasakah Governorate in the Syrian civil war
January 2021 events in Syria
Military operations of the Syrian civil war involving the Syrian Democratic Forces
Military operations of the Syrian civil war involving the Syrian government
Battles in 2021
Conflicts in 2021